The Dungeonmaster (originally Ragewar: The Challenges of Excalibrate and Digital Knights) is a 1984 American anthology fantasy film produced by Charles Band, and is split up into seven distinct story segments, each written and directed by a different person: Dave Allen, Band, John Carl Buechler, Steven Ford, Peter Manoogian, Ted Nicolaou and Rosemarie Turko. The film's theme was influenced by the popularity of Disney's 1982 film Tron and the roleplaying game Dungeons and Dragons.

Principal photography began in 1983 but the film was not completed until 1984. The film features an appearance by the heavy metal band W.A.S.P. The film is known for the line of dialogue "I reject your reality and I substitute my own". A sequel to the movie was shot and edited in 1988, but never completed.

Plot
Paul Bradford (Jeffrey Byron) is a skilled computer programmer who lives with his girlfriend, Gwen (Leslie Wing), and "X-CaliBR8", a quasi-sentient personal computer that Paul programmed and which he interacts with via a neural interface. Gwen is jealous of Paul's unusually close relationship with X-CaliBR8, to whom Paul has given a female voice, and fears that their relationship will be destroyed by Paul's reliance on X-CaliBR8 for his various day-to-day activities.

One night, Paul and Gwen are both transported to a Hellish realm presided over by Mestema (Richard Moll), an ancient, demonic sorcerer who has spent millennia seeking a worthy opponent with whom to do battle. Having long defeated his enemies with magic, Mestema has become intrigued with technology, and wishes to pit his skills against Paul's, with the winner claiming Gwen. Arming Paul with a portable version of X-CaliBR8 (which takes the form of a computerized wrist band), Mestema begins transporting Paul into a variety of scenarios in which he must defeat various opponents. Most of the challenges involve Paul using his X-CaliBR8 wristband to shoot people, monsters, and objects with laser beams.

After Paul completes Mestema's various challenges, the two engage in a final battle, which takes the form of a fist fight in which Paul kills Mestema by throwing him into a pit of lava. After Mestema dies, Paul and Gwen are transported back to their house, where Gwen expresses her acceptance of X-CaliBR8 and suggests that she and Paul get married.

Cast
 Jeffrey Byron - Paul Bradford, a skilled computer programmer who invented X-CaliBR8
 Richard Moll - Mestema 
 Leslie Wing - Gwen Rogers, Paul’s girlfriend
 Phil Fondacaro - Stone Canyon People
 Cleve Hall - Jack the Ripper
 Anthony T. Genova III - Desert Soldier 
 Lonnie Hashimoto - Samurai
 Chris Holmes - W.A.S.P. Guitar Player
 Michael Steve Jones - Desert Soldier 
 Peter Kent - Zombie
 Blackie Lawless - W.A.S.P. Singer 
 Paul Pape - Police Officer (uncredited)
 Randy Piper - W.A.S.P. Guitar Player
 Randy Popplewell - Desert Soldier
 Tony Richards - W.A.S.P. Drummer
 Felix Silla - Desert Bandit
 Kenneth J. Hall - Wolfman
 Jack Reed	- Mummy
 John Carl Buechler - Ratspit

Segments
 "Stone Canyon Giant" (David Allen)
 "Heavy Metal" (Charles Band)
 "Demons of the Dead" (John Carl Buechler)
 "Slasher" (Steven Ford)
 "Cave Beast" (Peter Manoogian)
 "Desert Pursuit" (Ted Nicolaou)
 "Ice Gallery" (Rosemarie Turko)

Release
Scream Factory released the film on DVD for the first time in October 2013, along with Contamination 7, Catacombs and Cellar Dweller as part of the second volume of their Scream Factory All-Night Horror Marathon series.

Shout! Factory released The Dungeonmaster on a double feature Blu-ray along with Eliminators in December 2015.

In pop culture
In MythBusters, Adam Savage quotes this movie.

The film is referenced in the 11th episode of Sword Art Online Abridged by Something Witty Entertainment.

References

External links
 
 
 

1984 films
1984 fantasy films
1984 independent films
1980s science fiction films
American fantasy films
American independent films
American science fiction horror films
Empire International Pictures films
Films about computing
Films about video games
Films directed by David W. Allen
Films directed by Charles Band
Films directed by John Carl Buechler
Films directed by Steven Ford
Films directed by Peter Manoogian
Films directed by Ted Nicolaou
Films directed by Rosemarie Turko
Films scored by Shirley Walker
Films scored by Richard Band
American horror anthology films
Fantasy anthology films
American exploitation films
American science fiction adventure films
American fantasy adventure films
American science fantasy films
1980s English-language films
1980s American films